Buckhorn Island State Park is an  state park located in Erie County, New York in the Town of Grand Island. The park is on the northern end of the island of Grand Island.

The park is 1 of 80 New York State Parks that are in the path of totality for the 2024 solar eclipse, with 3 minutes and 37 seconds of totality.

Park description
Buckhorn Island State Park is primarily an exhibit of Niagara River wetlands, and is managed as a preserve. As such, the park offers space for largely passive recreational uses, such as biking, cross-country skiing, fishing, hiking, and a nature trail.

A portion of the park has been set aside as a bird conservation area in order to protect nesting habitat for several species listed as threatened in New York State, including the least bittern, northern harrier, common tern, and sedge wren. The protected habitat also serves as a feeding and breeding area for numerous other species of waterfowl. The park's wetlands serve as an overwintering location for 19 species of gulls, nearly half of the world's 45 species.

See also
 List of New York state parks
 Navy Island National Historic Site of Canada

References

External links
 New York State Parks: Buckhorn Island State Park

State parks of New York (state)
Robert Moses projects
Parks in Erie County, New York